Rarities Volume I & Volume II is a two-album series collecting songs by The Who, released in 1983 on Polydor in the United Kingdom.

Release history

The first release in this series was a single LP titled "Join Together - Rarities" issued by Polydor in Australia and New Zealand in 1982. This album combined hard to find songs from Who, which were initially released in the UK on singles between 1970 and 1973. This album had the same contents as the later Rarities Volume II with the exception of a shorter version of "I Don't Even Know Myself". This shortened version fades out about twenty seconds early, while cutting off the full ending.

In 1983, after the announcement of the Who's Last Tour, Polydor UK expanded on the original concept by compiling two separate albums of hard to find Who tracks. All of them had previously appeared on singles or EPs. The albums were titled Rarities Vol. 1 "1966–1968" and Rarities Vol. 2 "1970–1973". 

After the LP releases the same material was re-released on a single CD. Some copies of the CD version were defective and were replaced by the manufacturer. Defective copies may still be in circulation.

Some copies of the Vol. 2 LP may also contain the shortened version of "I Don't Even Know Myself". Some versions of these releases also mistakenly use the common stereo album version of "Mary Anne with the Shaky Hand" in place of the much rarer mono B-side version. The B-side is actually a completely different recording of the same song.

Track listing

Rarities Volume I

Rarities  Volume II

Personnel
The Who

Roger Daltrey – lead vocals, harmonica
Pete Townshend – guitar, keyboards, backing vocals
John Entwistle – bass, backing vocals
Keith Moon – drums

Additional musicians

Nicky Hopkins – keyboards

References

Compilation album series
The Who compilation albums
1983 compilation albums
Polydor Records compilation albums
B-side compilation albums